Bourg – Ceyzériat Airport  is an airport located  east of Bourg-en-Bresse and northwest of Ceyzériat, both communes of the Ain department in the Rhône-Alpes region of France.

Facilities

The airport is open 24 hours and offers Pilot Controlled Lighting for Night VFR flights.

It is walking distance from Bourg-en-Bresse Jasseron motorway station which offers a restaurant and hotel.

Airlines and destinations 
There is no scheduled commercial air service at this time.

References

External links
 Aéro-club de Bourg-en-Bresse
 

Airports in Auvergne-Rhône-Alpes
Buildings and structures in Ain